Peter Wolframovich Bezukladnikov is former General Director of Russian biggest engineering company E4 Group (revenue $1.5bln, 18,000 employees) and formerly a scientist in the field of structural analysis of carbohydrates. From September 2009 - the executive vice president, director of the electric power department of the TEK Business Unit, Sistema OJSC.

Education and Scientific Career 
Peter Bezukladnikov graduated from the Department of Molecular and Chemical Physics of the Moscow Institute of Physics and Technology in 1982 and continued on to receive Ph.D. in chemistry. As a scientist at the Pacific Institute of Bioorganic Chemistry, Far East Branch of the USSR Academy of Sciences, he was the first to apply ESI/AP/MS (Electrospray ionization/atmospheric pressure/Mass spectrometry) for the structural analysis of carbohydrates.

References

External links 
 Biography of Peter Bezukladnikov (Петр Безукладников) on `E4 Group` official web site»
 Biography of Peter Bezukladnikov (Петр Безукладников) on  viperson web site»
 
 Peter Bezukladnikov (Петр Безукладников) about engineering

1959 births
Living people
Russian businesspeople
Moscow Institute of Physics and Technology alumni
Russian chemists
Businesspeople from Lviv